The New Economic School – Georgia (NESG) (in Georgian: ახალი ეკონომიკური სკოლა საქართველო) is a free market think-tank, non-profit organisation, NGO based in Tbilisi, Georgia. Its main mission is education of young people in free market ideas. It organizes seminars, workshops and conferences for education and exchanges of ideas. NESG was founded by Georgian individuals to fill the gap of the market economy knowledge in the country and the deficit of good teachers and economics textbooks. According to the 2014 Global Go To Think Tank Index Report (Think Tanks and Civil Societies Program, University of Pennsylvania), NESG is number 22 (of 45) "Top Think Tanks in Central Asia".

The name New Economic School means different vision, school of thought. NESG is not an academic institution but rather a voluntary cooperation of individuals to find more ideas about Human Action. NESG was established as an alternative to Marxian school which was very influential having an absolute monopoly in the academic circles and universities in Georgia.

Vision 
According to its web-site, NESG is a libertarian think-tank. It helps the new generations in Georgia and the South Caucasus to understand more about how the market works. It is also supporting young politicians and journalists to find out what kind of economic policies exist in the world. Ideas of the NESG are based on the two approaches of Public Choice and Austrian School of Economics. NESG seminars teach their students ideas of Adam Smith, David Ricardo, Carl Menger. Ludwig von Mises, Friedrich Hayek, Murray Rothbard, James Buchanan, Gordon Tullock and other great thinkers of contemporary classical liberalism and libertarianism.

Activities 
NESG is active in two directions seminars and publications. The activities are financed by the NESG and its partners European or American charitable foundations. All the publications are posted on the web-site of the NESG and can be downloaded for free. NESG doesn't charge any fee for participating in the seminars.

The themes of the seminars and publications are academic and public policy to bring better knowledge to young people. Main policy ideas discussed by the participants on the seminars are: property rights, education, health, pensions, public transportation, public services etc. These ideas are crucial for the Georgian individuals to leave the poverty and reorganize country of Georgia into a contemporary market society with free but responsible people.

Web-sites 
NESG uses its web-site for educational purposes. All articles, e-books, video and audio materials put on the web-site (http://www.nesgeorgia.org) are free to use and download and are a great help for the young people who can't pay high fees to study abroad or buy expensive textbooks. The web-site includes a special internal page: Home Education.

Most of the materials on the web-sites are in English and Georgian languages. There are also some e-books in Russian and French.

Publications 
Publications of the NESG in Georgian:
Library of Liberty volumes:
 Basics of Liberalism, 2005
 Liberalism and Power, 2006
 Property and Liberty, 2007
 Intellectuals, Education and Liberty, 2008
 Liberal Reforms, 2009
 Liberal Thinkers, 2010
 Money of Liberty, 2011

Other publications:
 Adventures of Johnathan Gullible, Ken Schooland 2007;
 Law and Which is Seen and Which is not seen, Frederic Bastiat, 2008;
 Georgian Lectures, Tibor Machan, 2007,
 Journalist's Guide to Economics, 2008
 Bureaucracy, Ludwig von Mises, 2013
 Freedom and the Law, Bruno Leoni, 2014

Think-Tank Networks 
NESG is a member of different networks such as:
 Economic Freedom Network of the Fraser Institute of Canada (from 2004)
 World taxpayers Associations World Taxpayers Associations (2009)
 Free Market Road Show Free Market Road Show (2006)
 Atlas Network Atlas Economic Research Foundation (2004)
 European Resource Bank Real-Estate Broker Europe (2005)
 Coalition for European Georgia (2011)
 Tea Party World Movement (2012)

References

Political and economic think tanks based in Europe
Libertarian think tanks
Think tanks based in Georgia (country)
Politics of Georgia (country)
Libertarianism in Europe